The Michipicoten First Nation (locally pronounced as Michipigodong) is an Ojibway First Nation band government in Northern Ontario, located near Wawa.  Members of the community have lived at the mouth of the Michipicoten River since before the first arrival of European settlers to the area. Their reserves include Chapleau 61, Gros Cap 49, Gros Cap Indian Village 49A and Missanabie 62.

The Michipicoten went through several forced moves during the 19th and 20th centuries, causing significant disruption to the community.  Members of the First Nation concluded a historic land agreement with the governments of Canada and Ontario in January 2008, after a successful referendum.

Notable members 
 Chris Simon, ice hockey player, Stanley Cup winner w/ 1996 Colorado Avalanche

External links 
 Michipicoten First Nation (archived)
 Michipicoten First Nation (current website)

References

First Nations governments in Ontario